Josefina Eugenia Vázquez Mota ( [xo̞.se̞'fi.na'βas.ke̞s'mo̞.ta]) (born 20 January 1961, in Mexico City) is a businessperson and politician who was the presidential candidate of the National Action Party (PAN) for the 2012 elections. Vázquez Mota was trained as an economist and began her working career in family businesses and with various business organizations and conferences, also working as a journalist and writing books. She began her political career with the  organization, becoming involved in Mexico’s federal Chamber of Deputies of Mexico and then in the administrations of Vicente Fox and Felipe Calderón. She was PAN's first female candidate for president.

Background
Vázquez Mota was born in Mexico City on 20 January 1961. Her parents, Arnulfo Vázquez and Josefina Mota, are from the Sierra Norte de Puebla region of Mexico, and she has seven brothers and sisters. She says she is closest to her sister Lupita. When they were children they use to sell chocolate shakes on the street with a blender Josefina received for Day of the Magi.

Vázquez Mota spent the first five years of her childhood in a working-class neighborhood called Colonia 20 de Noviembre in Mexico City and began her education in public school, starting at “La Patria es Primero” school in the Azcapotzalco borough. Her father originally wanted her to attend an all-girls high school, even paying a full year’s tuition in advance. While she did begin high school there, Josefina convinced her parents to let her take the entrance exam and enter CECyT 9 vocational school, affiliated with the Instituto Politécnico Nacional. Josefina was studious in school with an affinity for mathematics.

Vázquez Mota studied at the private Universidad Iberoamericana, graduating with a degree in economics. Other university studies included courses in management at the  Instituto Panamericano de Alta Dirección de Empresas, as well as a program called "Ideas e Instituciones" ("Ideas and Institutions") at the Instituto Tecnológico Autónomo de México.

Vázquez Mota met her husband, Sergio Ocampo Muñoz, a computer specialist, while in high school. The couple married in 1984 after seven years of courtship.  The couple have three children: María José; Celia María; and Montserrat.

Vázquez Mota maintains a very strict diet and exercise regimen, as evidenced by an unusually thin physique. She has consistently denied speculation that she suffers from either bulimia or anorexia.

Non-political career

Vázquez Mota began to get involved in economic conferences due to a friend of her father’s with the Cámara de Comercio de la Ciudad de Mexico (Mexico City Chamber of Commerce) and has since been involved with various organizations and conferences in various parts of the world, especially Latin America. She worked for business organizations such as the  Confederación de Cámaras Nacionales de Comercio, Servicios y Turismo (Concanaco) and  the Confederación Patronal de la República Méxicana (Coparmex).

For a time in her career, she worked as a journalist on economic topics for Novedades de México, El Financiero and El Economista. In the 1980s, Josefina and her family moved to Chihuahua to attend some of the family businesses including a clothing store for children.

She has published two books. The first was “¡Dios Mío! Házme viuda por favor” (My God! Make me a widow!) It is a self-help book that she wrote while in Chihuahua and while traveling to various conferences. It was first published in Colombia then in Mexico, as there was some hesitation over the title. Despite editors’ desire to change the title to something less controversial, Josefina insisted on keeping it. The book has sold over 400,000 copies. Her second book is called "Nuestra oportunidad. Un México para todos" (Our opportunity. A México for everyone), which is a dialogue with twenty two international leaders. She did a business show for TV Azteca.

Political career

Vázquez Mota began her political career with PAN with the Asociación Coordinadora Ciudadana and a member of the Secretaría de la Mujer. In 1996, she was asked to return to Mexico City to become a representative in Mexico’s federal legislature (Cámara de Diputados), because of her economics expertise. At this time, she met the then president of PAN, Felipe Calderón .  She was elected to the 2000-2003 federal legislature (Cámara de Diputados), leading the sub-coordination of  Economic Policy. She was then appointed as the first female secretary of Desarrollo Social (Social Development) known by its Spanish acronym of SEDESOL. While discrete, it was known that she did not get along with then First Lady Martha Sahagún .  She remained in that position until 2006, when she resigned to work for the Calderón campaign.

In 2006, she was named campaign coordinator for Felipe Calderón. She was not part of Calderón’s inner circle which caused some disputes during the campaign. When Calderón won, she was part of the transition team as the Coordinator of Political ties (Enlace Político). After the election, she was named Secretary of Public Education, the first woman in the job.  Josefina had vied for the Secretaría de Gobernación position but she was offered to return to SEDESOL or to head the Secretariat of Public Education. She chose the latter as a new challenge. Her time there was marked by confrontations with the powerful head of the national teachers’ union, Elba Esther Gordillo. Some reports state that these confrontations caused problems with Calderon’s advisors with Calderon ready to remove her from the position, but this has not been confirmed. She won election to the Cámara de Diputados once again, this time becoming the Coordinator of the PAN Parliamentary Group. This gave her position to run for her party’s nomination for the 2012 presidential elections. She was in charge of PAN’s parliamentary group from 2009 to 2011.

In 2011, she left the legislature when she won her party’s nomination as candidate for president. She won the nomination over Calderón’s choice of Ernesto J. Cordero, with 55% of the vote in the primary.  She was the first female candidate for president of PAN,  and the first female candidate for president from a major political party in Mexico’s history. She ran not only as “different” from the other contenders but also different from her party, which had been in power for the previous twelve years.  She was the least-known of the candidates from Mexico’s three main parties (PAN, PRI and PRD).

One of her campaign pledges was life sentences for politicians found guilty of corruption related to organized crime, more scholarships for students, and labor-law reforms, which she said would incorporate 400,000 people each year into the formal economy. She also promised to fight discrimination against women. She did not come out against the policies of her predecessors, Calderón and Fox. and stated that military personnel should be withdrawn only when the area has a “trustworthy” police force. She is also the National Political Advisor (Consejera Política Nacional) of PAN.

She placed third in the election, drawing 25.4% of the vote.

References

External links 

 Official Site Federal Deputies PAN of the LXI Legislature
 Josefina Vazquez Mota Twitter
 Biography at CIDOB site (in Spanish)

|-

|-

1961 births
Living people
Politicians from Mexico City
Members of the Chamber of Deputies (Mexico)
Mexican economists
Mexican women economists
Mexican Secretaries of Social Development
Women members of the Chamber of Deputies (Mexico)
Universidad Iberoamericana alumni
21st-century Mexican politicians
21st-century Mexican women politicians
Women Secretaries of State of Mexico
Candidates in the 2012 Mexican presidential election